The Hungry Years is an album by Neil Sedaka, the title of which is an eponymous track from the album. It was released by The Rocket Record Company in 1975.

The album is the American edition of Overnight Success, with two songs being replaced.   
    
"Bad Blood," a duet with Elton John, hit #1 on the Billboard Hot 100 for three weeks, was certified gold, and was the most commercially successful single of his career; his follow-up, a slowed-down, bluesy remake of his 1962 #1 smash "Breaking Up Is Hard to Do," hit #8 on the Hot 100 and #1 on the Billboard Adult Contemporary Chart over December 1975-January 1976.  "The Queen of 1964," from his British-released Overnight Success album, reached #35 in the UK in March 1975.  The title track, one of Sedaka's most frequently requested non-single tracks, marked Sedaka's reunion with Howard Greenfield after having broken off their partnership in 1973.

The Captain and Tennille covered "Lonely Night (Angel Face)", a track from The Hungry Years; their version reached #3 on the Hot 100 and was certified gold.   The song dea Sedaka and Greenfield would again work together more regularly in the late 1970s.

Track listing 
All music composed by Sedaka; lyricist in (parentheses).

Side One
"Crossroads" (Phil Cody) 
"Lonely Night (Angel Face)" (Sedaka)
"Stephen" (Howard Greenfield)
"Bad Blood" (Cody) (duet with Elton John) 
"Your Favorite Entertainer" (Cody)
"Baby Blue" (Greenfield)

Side Two
"Tit for Tat" (Greenfield)
"New York City Blues" (Cody) 
"When You Were Lovin' Me" (Cody) 
 "The Hungry Years" (Greenfield)
"Breaking Up Is Hard to Do" (Greenfield; torch version originally arranged by Lenny Welch)

Bonus Tracks from the 1998 CD re-issue
 (12) "Hey Mister Sunshine" (Dara Sedaka) 
 (13) "The Queen Of 1964"*  
 (14) "Betty Grable" 
 (15) "Goodman Goodbye"* (Sedaka, Cody)
"The Queen of 1964" was from Overnight Success; it was replaced by "Tit For Tat" in The Hungry Years.
"Goodman Goodbye" was from Overnight Success; it was replaced by "Your Favorite Entertainer" in The Hungry Years.

Certifications

References

1975 albums
Neil Sedaka albums
The Rocket Record Company albums